Syrtlanovo (Hırtlan) is a rural locality (a village) in Ishtuganovsky Selsoviet, Meleuzovsky District, Bashkortostan, Russia. The population was 335 as of 2010. There are 3 streets.

Geography 
Syrtlanovo is located 53 km east of Meleuz (the district's administrative centre) by road. Pribelsky is the nearest rural locality.

References 

Rural localities in Meleuzovsky District